Midnight Remember is the second and final studio album by Australian rock band Little Red, released in Australia and New Zealand through Liberation Music on 10 September 2010. Midnight Remember debuted and peaked at number 5 on the Australian album charts and remained in the charts for 12 weeks where it was certified Gold, mostly due to the success of the highly successful single "Rock It", which was accredited with Platinum status.

The album produced three singles. The most successful, "Rock It", reached number 19 on the ARIA Singles Chart and was voted into second place in the Triple J Hottest 100 for 2010.

Production 
Midnight Remember was produced by Scott Horscroft, who had worked on albums previously for bands such as The Presets and The Panics. The recording sessions for the album took place at The Grove Studios located on the Central Coast, while final mixing occurred at Big Jesus Burger Studios in Sydney.

Production on the album began in April 2010, after three years of experimentation:

The band considered Midnight Remember to be "difficult" to record, considering the success of the debut album Listen to Little Red.

Track listing

Charts

Certifications

References 

2010 albums
Little Red (band) albums